The Chile women's national under-18 volleyball team represents Chile in women's under-18 volleyball Events, it is controlled and managed by the Chilean Volleyball Federation that is a member of South American volleyball body Confederación Sudamericana de Voleibol (CSV) and the international volleyball body government the Fédération Internationale de Volleyball (FIVB).

Results

Summer Youth Olympics
 Champions   Runners up   Third place   Fourth place

FIVB U18 World Championship
 Champions   Runners up   Third place   Fourth place

South America U18 Championship
 Champions   Runners up   Third place   Fourth place

Pan-American U18 Cup
 Champions   Runners up   Third place   Fourth place

Team

Current squad
The following is the Chilean roster in the 2019 Girls' Youth Pan-American Volleyball Cup.

Head Coach:  Eduardo Guillaume

References

External links
Chilean Volleyball Federation 

Volleyball
National women's under-18 volleyball teams
Volleyball in Chile